Cinemanía is a Spanish language monthly film magazine based in Madrid, Spain. It has been in circulation since 1995.

History and profile
Cinemanía was first published in October 1995. The magazine is headquartered in Madrid. It was part of Prisa Revistas, a subsidiary of PRISA company. It was published by Promotora General de Revistas, S.A and comes out monthly. 

In 2018, the magazine was acquired by Grupo Henneo.

It covers both Spanish movies and international ones. It also features interviews, reports and reviews.

Cinemanía was redesigned in May 2002 and in October 2005.

References

External links
 

1995 establishments in Spain
Film magazines published in Spain
Magazines established in 1995
Magazines published in Madrid
Monthly magazines published in Spain
PRISA
Spanish-language magazines